Yuri Radonyak (8 October 1935 – 28 March 2013) was a Russian welterweight boxer who competed for the Soviet Army club. In 1958 he placed second at the Soviet championships and won the World Army Championships. Two years later he won the Soviet title and a silver medal at the 1960 Olympics. He retired in 1962 with a record of 197 wins out of 226 bouts and later had a long career as a boxing coach. In 1962–73 he worked at the Soviet Army club in Moscow and in 1972–76 coached the Soviet national team. The 1972 Olympic gold medalist Vyacheslav Lemeshev was his personal trainee.

References 

1935 births
2013 deaths
Sportspeople from Grozny
Boxers at the 1960 Summer Olympics
Light-middleweight boxers
Middleweight boxers
Olympic boxers of the Soviet Union
Olympic silver medalists for the Soviet Union
Soviet male boxers
Olympic medalists in boxing
Russian male boxers
Medalists at the 1960 Summer Olympics